Pain de seigle valaisan is a rye bread from Valais, Switzerland. It is recognized with an appellation d'origine protégée (AOP). It is often served with raclette cheese and charcuterie.

History of Pain de seigle valaisan begins in the Middle Ages, it was baked into bread in the European Alpine regions. The importance of rye bread in Valais is evidenced by records dating back to 1209. At that time, it was the main ingredient in the daily diet in the Valais villages. The oven, which was used for the collective production of bread in the village, was stoked only two or three times a year. Therefore, bakery products such as Valais rye bread had to be stored for a particularly long time.

References

Rye breads
Swiss breads